Solomzi Thandubuntu Phenduka  (18 February 1987)  better known as Sol Phenduka is a South African radio personality, music DJ and podcaster.

Life and Career
Phenduka was born in Vosloorus and raised by a single mother. He attended St Francis College in Benoni, matriculating in 2006 and later receiving a Bachelor's degree from the University of Johannesburg. His music interest began at an early age as a rapper.

Radio and Podcasting 
Phenduka started his radio career as an intern at YFM. He later joined 5FM on its new breakfast show at the time with DJ Fresh on "Fresh at 5". After a suspension at 5FM, he joined Macgyver Mukwevho on Podcast and Chill with MacG YouTube podcast where he was subsequently hired by Kaya FM to co-host the breakfast show with Dineo Ranaka.

Music
Phenduka has released two singles in 2010 and 2011, and an album in 2012. He was also part of the contestants on Big Brother Mzansi in 2014.

References

South African DJs
Living people
1987 births
Electronic dance music DJs